Terakanambi  is a village in the southern state of Karnataka, India. It is located in the Gundlupet taluk of Chamarajanagar district in Karnataka. Terakanambi has historical temples of Lakshmi Varadaraja Swamy, Triyambakapura, Hulugana Muradi Venkataramana Swamy, Hande Gopalaswamy and many more, and was the pre-coronation home of Kanthirava Narasaraja I aka Ranadhira Narasaraja (reigned 1638–1659).

Demographics
 India census, Terakanambi had a population of 7,738 with 3,898 males and 3,840 females.

See also
 Chamarajanagar
 Districts of Karnataka

References

External links
 http://Chamarajanagar.nic.in/

Villages in Chamarajanagar district